Carla Buchanan (born 31 July 1995) is an Australian swimmer. She competed in the women's 100 metre freestyle event at the 2018 FINA World Swimming Championships (25 m), in Hangzhou, China.

References

External links
 

1995 births
Living people
Australian female freestyle swimmers
Place of birth missing (living people)
21st-century Australian women